Parapercis sagma, the saddled sandperch, is a fish species in the sandperch family, Pinguipedidae. It is found from Indonesia and Vanuatu. This species reaches a length of

References

Pinguipedidae
Taxa named by Gerald R. Allen
Taxa named by Mark van Nydeck Erdmann
Fish described in 2012
Fish of Indonesia
Fish of the Pacific Ocean